The "Skin Hunters" ("Łowcy skór" in Polish) is the media nickname for four hospital casualty workers from the Polish city of Łódź, who were convicted of murdering at least five elderly patients and selling information regarding their deaths to competing funeral homes. The price of the bribes paid to the killers was billed to the family of the deceased as an additional funeral charge. The perpetrators were apprehended in 2002. Their descriptive designation was coined by a newspaper article which first brought the story to the public's attention.

Case
On January 20, 2007 four employees from a hospital casualty department in Łódź were sentenced. The perpetrators were shown to have killed mostly elderly patients using the muscle relaxant pancuronium (brand name Pavulon). The four workers then sold information about the deceased patients to funeral homes, so they could contact the relatives before other funeral homes could. They exacted bribes ranging from 12,000 to over 70,000 zlotys.

The killers are:
 Paramedic Andrzej Nowocień was sentenced to life in prison for the murder of four patients and for helping Karol Banaś in a further murder. He confessed to more than 50 murders to a cellmate.
 Paramedic Karol Banaś was sentenced to 25 years imprisonment for the "particularly cruel" ("szczególnie okrutne") murder of Ludmiła Ś. and for helping Andrzej Nowocień murder  the other patients.
 Doctor Janusz Kuliński was sentenced to six years and banned from practising medicine for 10 years, for willfully endangering 10 patients.
 Doctor Paweł Wasilewski was sentenced to five years and banned from practising medicine for 10 years for the willful endangering of four patients.

Their sentences were upheld by the Łódź Appeal Court in June 2008. Further appeal was rejected by the Supreme Court of Poland on October 27, 2009.

The investigation into the scandal is still ongoing and a total of forty other members of the casualty department are under investigation, as are the owners of a local funeral home for receiving information regarding the deaths of patients. The funeral home added the cost of the bribes it paid to the killers to the bills that the families of the deceased paid for their funerals.

Discovery
They described how the hospital workers or paramedics would call funeral homes regarding patient deaths in order to receive a bribe, and sometimes even killed patients. The dead patients were called "skins" and so the article was called "Skin Hunters" (Łowcy skór).

In popular culture
In 2003, a film Skin Hunters was made of the case starring Piotr Adamczyk. In 2008, a documentary of the events, Necrobusiness, was made by a Swedish company.

The Swedish novelist - "Arne Dahl", also used the events as an inspiration in his book "A Midsummer Night's Dream" (2003)

References

External links
BBC report

2007 murders in Poland
2000s murders in Poland
21st-century Polish criminals
Health care professionals convicted of murdering patients
Hospital scandals
Male serial killers
Medical controversies in Poland
Medical serial killers
Murder in Poland
Poisoners
Polish serial killers